Danais (Latinised as Dacorum) Hundred was a judicial and taxation subdivision (a hundred) of Hertfordshire, in the west of the county, that existed from the 10th to the 19th century. It gave its name to the local government district of Dacorum. Danais was Latinised to Dacorum in 1196. The name Danais means the Hundred of the Danes and refers to its incorporation into the Danelaw for a period in the tenth century.

The territory of the hundred is interwoven with that of Cashio, which suggests that Cashio was carved out of Danais in the early eleventh century in order to provide a single jurisdiction for the Abbot of St Albans.

The parishes in Danais at the time of Domesday were:
Abbots Langley (partial)
Aldenham
Barworth
Bushey
Caddington
Flamstead
Great Gaddesden (partial)
Kensworth
Redbourn (partial)
Shenley
Wheathampstead
Windbridge (partial)
In the 16th century, Dacorum absorbed the hundred of Tring, and afterwards the hundred also included the following parishes:

 Aldbury
 Great Berkhampsted
 Little Gaddesden
 Hemel Hempstead
 King's Langley
 Puttenham
 Redbourn (remainder)
 Shenley
 Wigginton
 Great Gaddesden (remainder)

See also 
List of hundreds of England and Wales - Hertfordshire

References 

History of Hertfordshire
Hundreds of Hertfordshire